Andrew Smith is a former British slalom canoeist who competed in the 1980s. He won a bronze medal in the C-2 team event at the 1983 ICF Canoe Slalom World Championships in Meran.

References

External links 
 Andrew SMITH at CanoeSlalom.net

British male canoeists
Living people
Year of birth missing (living people)
Medalists at the ICF Canoe Slalom World Championships